Sharon Balaban is an Israel artist. She creates short videos, from several seconds to 6 minutes.

Early life and education
Balaban was born in Jerusalem, Israel.  She graduated from Bezalel Academy of Art and Design in Jerusalem in 1999 and she finished her Master of Fine Arts at The City University of New York in 2003.

Work
Balaban's short films represent objects and scenes from our own lives, from dish soap and pot cleaning to brushing teeth. She usually changes the original meanings of objects in order to present her concepts (Water flowing from tap resembles the luminous nude female, the peal of banana is a bird and dead bird flaps its wings). Her videos are whimsical and poetic.  She aims to bring politics into her works indirectly, and uses household objects to create a discussion about gender roles and the place of the woman in the house, using video recording can manage to express her language.

She said in a 2014 interview:“Art deals with the everyday, with consumerism, and art galleries upgrade the objects they exhibit – both in terms of the place and the price,” 
Balaban's works are mostly made at home or studio instead of outdoor shoots.  Objects, close-ups, body fragments, and nature are frequently used in her works. They also frequently employ simple techniques, short videos, ambient lighting and no scenography.

Balaban has presented her works in solo and group exhibitions in Israel, the US, Germany, Poland, Denmark, Belgium, Holland, and the Czech Republic. Currently, She lives and works as a head of The Video Unit at the Screen based arts department at the Bezalel Academy of Art and Design in Jerusalem.

Awards and recognition
Gesher Foundation Award for Jerusalem, Wildlife Diary, 2008  
Israeli Ministry of Culture – Encouragement of Creation Award, 2008 
Ministry of Culture – Young Artist Award, 2004 
Israeli Ministry of Immigration & Absorption – Returning Artist Scholarship (Cum Laude), 2003
The America – Israel Cultural Foundation Scholarship Award for Artistic Achievement, 1998-2004
Foundation for the Advancement of Interdisciplinary Art Award in Memory of Dan Zakheim, 1999

References 

Israeli video artists
Bezalel Academy of Arts and Design alumni
Living people
1971 births